Kajiado is a town in Kajiado County, Kenya. Kajiado has an urban population of 24,678 (2019 census). Local people are predominantly of the Maasai tribe.

Kajiado is the headquarters for Kajiado County.

The name "Kajiado" comes from the word "Olkeju-ado." Which means "The Long River" in the Maasai language. The seasonal river named after the town runs from West to the East of the town.

The original name for Kajiado was "Olpurapurana", which means "a round elevation".

Transport 

Kajiado has a station on the Magadi Soda Railway line which runs from Konza (on the Nairobi-Mombasa line) to Magadi. However this line operates limited passenger services, the most convenient way to travel to Kajiado from Nairobi is by using a matatu number 134, with NAEKANA sacco dominating the road transport to Kajiado town.

See also 

 Railway stations in Kenya
 Chamness Lake

References

External links 
 http://www.kajiado.go.ke
 https://web.archive.org/web/20070928011333/http://www.kajiado-district-dev-trust.org.uk/kajiado.htm
 https://www.hope4kajiado.org

Populated places in Kajiado County
County capitals in Kenya